Rafiga Mahmud qizi Shabanova (born October 31, 1943, Baku) is a former Soviet/Azerbaijani handball player who competed in the 1976 Summer Olympics.

In 1976 she won the gold medal with the Soviet team. She played three matches and scored one goal.

External links
profile

1943 births
Living people
Soviet female handball players
Azerbaijani female handball players
Handball players at the 1976 Summer Olympics
Olympic handball players of the Soviet Union
Olympic gold medalists for the Soviet Union
Sportspeople from Baku
Olympic medalists in handball
Medalists at the 1976 Summer Olympics
Soviet Azerbaijani people
Honoured Masters of Sport of the USSR